Greta Daniel (1909–1962) was an Associate Curator in the Department of Architecture and Design at The Museum of Modern Art, New York.

Early life and education 
Daniel was born in Essen. She graduated from the University of Munich and worked at the Museum Folkwang, Essen. She arrived in the United States as a refugee.

Career 
Daniel joined the Museum of Modern Art in 1943 as Assistant in the Department of Industrial Design, and by 1946 she had been named Assistant Curator.  Daniel became the resident expert on industrial design, playing an important role in developing the collection and contributing to numerous exhibitions.

In 1954 she edited the teaching portfolio Useful Objects Today.

During the 1950s and early 1960s, she authored articles in the journal Craft Horizons.

Death 
Daniel died suddenly in 1962. Sheila Hicks created the artwork Greta no. 55 (1961) in her memory.

Exhibitions 
 Thonet Furniture (1953)
 Playground Sculpture (1954)
 20th Century Design from the Museum Collection (1958)

References 

1909 births
1962 deaths
Created via preloaddraft
Emigrants from Nazi Germany to the United States
American women curators
American curators
German curators
German women curators